Takand (also Romanized as Tākand; also known as Mākant, Tahkan, Tahkant, and Takhkant) is a village in Qaqazan-e Gharbi Rural District, in the Central District of Takestan County, Qazvin Province, Iran. At the 2006 census, its population was 370, in 115 families.

References 

Populated places in Takestan County